K19JA-D, virtual and UHF digital channel 19, is a low-powered eScapes-affiliated television station licensed to Cortez, Colorado, United States. The station is owned by the Southwest Colorado TV Translator Association.

History 
The station’s construction permit was issued on February 22, 2011.

Digital channels
The station's signal is multiplexed:

References

External links

Low-power television stations in the United States
19JA-D
Television channels and stations established in 2011
2011 establishments in Colorado
Classic Arts Showcase affiliates